New Waterford may refer to:

New Waterford, Nova Scotia
New Waterford, Ohio
New Waterford Girl